Cryptocosma is a genus of moths of the family Crambidae. It contains only one species, Cryptocosma perlalis, which is found in Brazil, Suriname and Panama.

References

Acentropinae
Crambidae genera
Taxa named by Julius Lederer